Cyprian Michael Iwene Tansi , OCSO (September 1903 – 20 January 1964) was an Igbo Nigerian priest of the Catholic Church who worked in the Archdiocese of Onitsha, Nigeria, and then became a Trappist monk at Mount Saint Bernard Monastery in England.

On 22 March 1998, upon the recommendation of Cardinal Francis Arinze, he was beatified by Pope John Paul II.

His feast day is 20 January.

Heritage and early life
Tansi was born in September 1903, in an area of Nigeria under the control of the Royal Niger Company (RNC). The RNC maintained a trading outpost in Aguleri, purchasing palm oil from local farmers to sell abroad. An incident happened when a local person named Onwurume wanted to take a little palm oil to put on his roasted yam (yam is the staple food of Igbo people, and palm oil to yams is the cultural equivalent of butter to bread) and decided to puncture a barrel of palm oil to get some. When the hole he made caused the entire barrel to be emptied out, he ran away, but was grabbed by employees of the company and put into custody. When the local people heard about it, they gathered together to negotiate with the company agents, but the company called for military reinforcements and arrested twelve village chiefs who came to negotiate. Afterwards, they proceeded to attack the neighbouring villages, burning down the homes of the local people and looting their property, as well as mistakenly destroying a nearby village of a different group that had no relation to the incident.

Michael's father was Tabansi of Igbezunu, Aguleri. He was one of the people taken hostage by the Royal Niger Company and later released.  Michael was his first born, and he had another son with his first wife. Later he named his firstborn son 'Iwe-egbune', shortened to Iwene, meaning 'let malice not kill'; this was the birth-name of Cyprian Michael Iwene Tansi. His parents were poor farmers; they were not Christian. After the death of his first wife, Iwene's father married again. He and his second wife had four boys and one girl.

When Iwene was a young child, he became permanently blinded in one eye as a result of a mud-fight with other children.

His father sent Iwene to Holy Trinity School in Onitsha, which was run by the Holy Ghost Fathers. Tabansi meant for his son to get a better education that would help lead their family out of poverty, so that they would never again be taken advantage of by the westerners. Michael was baptized on July 7, 1913 with the Christian name of Michael. At the school, Michael served as an altar boy and catechist. Upon graduating, he became a teacher, and worked as a teacher from 1919-1925, Later, he became headmaster at St. Joseph's school in Aguleri.

Seminarian
At that time, there was little enthusiasm among Blacks to become priests in Nigeria. The Bishop was Irish, and most of the clergy were Europeans. Bishop Shanahan saw the native Igbo, even after conversion, as still being steeped in paganism, and that it was going to be difficult to teach them to be proper priests. While Igbo could become priests, they were subject to strict discipline and were often expelled from seminary for relatively minor lapses. The priests who taught them were concerned that only the very best men should become priests.

Michael attended St. Paul Seminary in Igbariam from 1925-1937. His family was appalled at his entrance to the seminary, because they wanted him to go into business or something that would take them out of poverty, which was what his father had always planned. His family was poor and desperately needed his help, but he felt that God, the same God he had learned about in the mission school his parents had sent him to as a child as a means of getting material benefits for the family, wanted him to continue in the seminary rather than do something else. There, he developed a particular devotion to the Sacred Heart of Jesus and to the Blessed Virgin Mary.

Parish priest
At that time in Nigeria, almost all priests were foreign missionaries.  Few Africans were being ordained to the priesthood. Tansi was ordained a priest for the Archdiocese of Onitsha at the Cathedral Basilica of the Most Holy Trinity in Onitsha on December 19, 1937.  

As Black priests became more common, some followed the lifestyle of the foreign missionaries. Monks and nuns also lived more comfortably than most Nigerians, and some people began looking at taking holy orders as a priest, monk or nun as a way to escape poverty.

When he became a parish priest, he lived a very austere life in comparison to the other priests around him. He built his own home using adobe, mud brick or other traditional materials. He would sleep on any bed, even if it was uncomfortable. He would eat even poorer food than what the local people ate, surviving on tiny portions of yam. He sometimes had a motorbike provided to him, but he often preferred to use a bicycle or even just to walk. He was not deterred from doing his work by tropical rainstorms.

His lifestyle shocked the Nigerian Catholics, who were not accustomed to this kind of priest. He became extremely popular and loved among the four parishes that he served in: Nnewi, Dunukofia, Akpu/Ajalli, and his home town Aguleri. He organized the community to help the poor and needy, and he personally would help people to build their own homes or perform other projects. He was very good at building homes, and taught people new building techniques, with adobe or mud brick, that were copied and used by the whole community. He was remembered as always being very kind.

He also stood up against oppression of women within the traditional culture and advised women to fight back against those who would rape or mistreat them. On one occasion, a female parishioner was attacked by a group of males, and she fought back against them. Fr Michael, who was nearby, came on his bicycle and joined with her and fought them until they fled. He then encouraged her to bring the assailants to court, which she did, winning the case against them and forcing them each to pay her four pounds; this case was a milestone in the establishment of women's rights in Nigeria.

He was unyielding in confronting vice among his flock. He had a special interest in preparing young women for marriage. With the help of local nuns, the women were taught about Christian marriage and how to care for the children they would have. He would organize the community to place the bride to be in a special home wherein she would be looked after until she got married. He would not allow men to see their brides before they got married, and if the groom attempted to go there without Fr. Tansi's permission, he could be penalized. He also had a women's group organized, who would enforce disciplines on their own members to avoid premarital sex and deter abortion.  He was also a very strict disciplinarian with students who failed to work hard at the parish school, to the point of hiding near the school, waiting for the bell to ring, and then, when he saw students coming late, coming out of his hiding place and penalising them for coming late to school.

He also was opposed to some aspects of the traditional pagan culture in Nigeria, especially the masquerades, who were believed to be spirits and used to punish innocent people at times. Nigerian pagans had murdered his own mother after claiming she was a witch who had caused mischief.

He gave the community advice and teachings about the right way to live in a practical fashion. For example, there were many mango trees in his locale, and it was common for people to go to the trees and throw rocks at the fruit. In the process, they would knock down far more than they were going to eat, or knock down the unripe fruit along with the ripened fruit, thus denuding the tree before the season was over. Michael considered this very wasteful, and told his parishioners to pluck each mango individually so that nothing was wasted and that they would not lack mangoes to eat later.

He was also remembered as being a perfectionist, which sometimes caused resentment among those under him. Later, his experience as a novice monk would give him insight into his earlier strict methods.

Trappist monk

While serving in his last parish, in his own hometown of Aguleri from 1949-1950, Michael began to become attracted to the monastic life. At that time, there were no monasteries established in Nigeria, and the Bishop was interested in the idea of sending some candidates to a monastery in Europe who would become monks in Europe and later return to Nigeria to start up the first Nigerian monastery. Michael and others were selected for this project.

1950 was a jubilee year in the church, and Michael was first sent to Rome to make the pilgrimage to the four major basilicas. He was then sent to Mount St. Bernard in England, to join the Trappist monks there. He arrived on 8 June 1950.

At the monastery, he joined the novitiate and took his vows, taking the name Cyprian after the Roman martyr. Cyprian worked in the refectory and bookbindery, and in the vegetable gardens and orchard. He used to say, “If you are going to be a Christian at all, you might as well live entirely for God”. Father Anselm Stark, who knew Fr Cyprian, recalled: "As a person he was very ordinary, very humble, obviously a great man of deep prayer and dedication."

Cyprian was sensitive to criticism, and his novice master was very hard on the new monks, and could always find things that were wrong with what he had done. This caused him much stress, and it was during this trying time that he understood that he had made some mistakes in Nigeria with the hard discipline and expectations he had placed on those under him. Despite fears of being treated with racial prejudice, he was fully accepted by the other monks, with the exception perhaps of one South African monk, who seemed to look for things to find wrong in his work. The English winter was also hard on him.

He was commissioned to establish a monastery not in Nigeria, but in neighboring Cameroon, but ill health changed those plans. He did not feel that the Nigeria independence movement had been properly done.  His health deteriorated, but he accepted death with no complaint. Before he died, he went to Leicester Royal Hospital, and, when he was examined, the doctor came out of the examination and spoke with monastery priest Fr. James, saying: "Can you help me please, Father? This man must be in terrific pain, but he will only admit that he has 'a little pain.'" He died the same day, as a result of arteriosclerosis and a ruptured aneurysm. The date of his death was 20 January 1964.

His body was buried at the monastery in England, but was later interred at the Cathedral Basilica of the Most Holy Trinity, Onitsha, Nigeria.

Quotations

 "Count no one saved, until he is found in heaven" (Onye afuro na enuigwe, si aguyi na)  
 "Do not be imitating the whites in everything, strive hard to gain the Kingdom of God. The whites are already in heaven in this world, but you are suffering every want. Are you going to suffer also in the next world: Life on earth could be compared to the journey of a young student who received a slip for a registered parcel, and he had to go to Lagos to claim this parcel. On the way he passed through many beautiful towns, towns with very attractive things in the shops. He started going from one shop to another, stretching his hands to the beautiful things he saw. He stopped so often in these big towns that he almost forgot what he was travelling for. It was after a long time that he ultimately reached Lagos, and when he went to claim the parcel he was told that the parcel had lain in the post for so long without him arriving to claim it that they had finally decided to send it back to the sender."

 "God will give you double for what you give Him"

 "If you want to eat vultures, you may as well eat seven of them, so that when people call you "vulture eater" you really deserve the name. If you want to become a Catholic, live as a faithful Catholic, so that when people see you, they know that you are a Catholic. If you are going to be a Christian at all, you might as well live entirely for God."

 "Whether you like it or not, saving your soul is your own business. If you are weak and fall by the wayside, we shall push you aside and tread on you as we march forward to meet God."

 "She is not 'Onye Bem' (a common Nigerian expression for wife, meaning 'in my place) but your wife, your better half, part of your own body. 'Onye' means a stranger which your wife is not. You must recognize the worth and position of your wife and treat her as your partner and your equal. Unless you do that, she is not a wife to you but a servant, and that is not what God wants a wife to be to the husband."

Veneration
He was recommended by Cardinal Francis Arinze, who was inspired by Tansi as a boy when Tansi had been one of his teachers.

He was beatified by Pope John Paul II on 22 March 1998, at Oba, Nigeria, becoming the first West African to be beatified. Pope John Paul said: "Blessed Cyprian Michael Tansi is a prime example of the fruits of holiness which have grown and matured in the Church in Nigeria since the Gospel was first preached in this land. He received the gift of faith through the efforts of the missionaries, and, taking the Christian way of life as his own, he made it truly African and Nigerian."

There is a statue of Father Tansi outside Most Holy Trinity Basilica in Onitsha. In 2010, Michael Cyprian Iwene Tansi was named a patron of Nigerian priests. Archbishop Valerian Okeke compared Father Tansi to St John Mary Vianney as a model of sanctity.

Institutions Named after Blessed Cyprian Iwene Tansi
 Blessed Iwene Tansi Major Seminary, Onitsha Anambra State Nigeria (Provincial Seminary)
 Blessed Iwene Tansi Secondary School, Aguleri
 Blessed Iwene Tansi Parish, Umudioka
Blessed Iwene Tansi Parish, Awada-Onitsha
Blessed Iwene Tansi Parish, Mba Farm, Onitsha
 Blessed Iwene Tansi Parish, Ugwu Orji Owerri Imo State
 Blessed Iwene Tansi Parish, Transekulu, Enugu State 
 Blessed Iwene Tansi Chaplaincy, Nike Grammar School, Enugu State
 Blessed Iwene Tansi Chaplaincy, Chukwuemeka Odumegwu Ojukwu University (Igbariam Campus)
 Tansi International College Awka
 Tansian University, Umunya
 Blessed Michael Tansi Catholic Church, Aba

References

External links
Publications on Blessed Iwene Tansi
Early history

1903 births
1964 deaths
Nigerian beatified people
Nigerian emigrants to the United Kingdom
Nigerian Roman Catholic priests
Igbo theologians
Trappists
20th-century venerated Christians
People from colonial Nigeria
People from Anambra State
Venerated Catholics by Pope John Paul II
20th-century Nigerian people
Trappist beatified people
20th-century Roman Catholic priests